Bon viveur is an English pseudo-French expression denoting someone who enjoys the good things in life, especially food and drink.

It may also refer to:
 A pseudonym used jointly by writers Johnnie Cradock and Fanny Cradock